Ivan Burtchin (Bulgarian: Иван Бурчин) (born December 9, 1952) is a Bulgarian sprint canoer who competed in the 1970s. Competing in two Summer Olympics, he won a bronze in the C-2 1000 m event at Munich in 1972.

Burtchin also won a bronze medal in the C-2 10000 m event at the 1975 ICF Canoe Sprint World Championships in Belgrade.

References

Sports-reference.com profile (As Ivan Burchin)

1952 births
Bulgarian male canoeists
Canoeists at the 1972 Summer Olympics
Canoeists at the 1976 Summer Olympics
Olympic canoeists of Bulgaria
Olympic bronze medalists for Bulgaria
Living people
Olympic medalists in canoeing
ICF Canoe Sprint World Championships medalists in Canadian
Medalists at the 1972 Summer Olympics